Sita Devi may also refer to:
 Sita Devi (Maharani of Kapurthala) (1915–2002), wife of a younger son of Maharaja Jagatjit Singh
 Sita Devi, Maharani of Baroda (1917–1989)
 Sita Devi (painter) (1914–2005), Indian artist
 Sita Devi Boudel, Nepalese politician
 Seeta Devi (actress) (1912–1983), silent film actress
 Sita Devi Yadav, Nepalese politician